Stochastic resonance (SR) is a phenomenon in which a signal that is normally too weak to be detected by a sensor, can be boosted by adding white noise to the signal, which contains a wide spectrum of frequencies. The frequencies in the white noise corresponding to the original signal's frequencies will resonate with each other, amplifying the original signal while not amplifying the rest of the white noise – thereby increasing the signal-to-noise ratio, which makes the original signal more prominent. Further, the added white noise can be enough to be detectable by the sensor, which can then filter it out to effectively detect the original, previously undetectable signal.

This phenomenon of boosting undetectable signals by resonating with added white noise extends to many other systems – whether electromagnetic, physical or biological – and is an active area of research.

Stochastic resonance was first proposed by the Italian physicists Roberto Benzi, Alfonso Sutera and Angelo Vulpiani in 1981, and the first application they proposed (together with Giorgio Parisi) was in the context of climate dynamics.

Technical description
Stochastic resonance (SR) is observed when noise added to a system changes the system's behaviour in some fashion. More technically, SR occurs if the signal-to-noise ratio of a nonlinear system or device increases for moderate values of noise intensity. It often occurs in bistable systems or in systems with a sensory threshold and when the input signal to the system is "sub-threshold." For lower noise intensities, the signal does not cause the device to cross threshold, so little signal is passed through it. For large noise intensities, the output is dominated by the noise, also leading to a low signal-to-noise ratio. For moderate intensities, the noise allows the signal to reach threshold, but the noise intensity is not so large as to swamp it. Thus, a plot of signal-to-noise ratio as a function of noise intensity contains a peak.

Strictly speaking, stochastic resonance occurs in bistable systems, when a small periodic (sinusoidal) force is applied together with a large wide band stochastic force (noise). The system response is driven by the combination of the two forces that compete/cooperate to make the system switch between the two stable states. The degree of order is related to the amount of periodic function that it shows in the system response. When the periodic force is chosen small enough in order to not make the system response switch, the presence of a non-negligible noise is required for it to happen. When the noise is small, very few switches occur, mainly at random with no significant periodicity in the system response. When the noise is very strong, a large number of switches occur for each period of the sinusoid, and the system response does not show remarkable periodicity. Between these two conditions, there exists an optimal value of the noise that cooperatively concurs with the periodic forcing in order to make almost exactly one switch per period (a maximum in the signal-to-noise ratio).

Such a favorable condition is quantitatively determined by the matching of two timescales: the period of the sinusoid (the deterministic time scale) and the Kramers rate (i.e., the average switch rate induced by the sole noise: the inverse of the stochastic time scale). Thus the term "stochastic resonance."

Stochastic resonance was discovered and proposed for the first time in 1981 to explain the periodic recurrence of ice ages. Since then, the same principle has been applied in a wide variety of systems. Nowadays stochastic resonance is commonly invoked when noise and nonlinearity concur to determine an increase of order in the system response.

Suprathreshold
Suprathreshold stochastic resonance is a particular form of stochastic resonance, in which random fluctuations, or noise, provide a signal processing benefit in a nonlinear system. Unlike most of the nonlinear systems in which stochastic resonance occurs, suprathreshold stochastic resonance occurs when the strength of the fluctuations is small relative to that of an input signal, or even small for random noise. It is not restricted to a subthreshold signal, hence the qualifier.

Neuroscience, psychology and biology

Stochastic resonance has been observed in the neural tissue of the sensory systems of several organisms. Computationally, neurons exhibit SR because of non-linearities in their processing. SR has yet to be fully explained in biological systems, but neural synchrony in the brain (specifically in the gamma wave frequency) has been suggested as a possible neural mechanism for SR by researchers who have investigated the perception of "subconscious" visual sensation. Single neurons in vitro including cerebellar Purkinje cells and squid giant axon could also demonstrate the inverse stochastic resonance, when spiking is inhibited by synaptic noise of a particular variance.

Medicine
SR-based techniques have been used to create a novel class of medical devices for enhancing sensory and motor functions such as vibrating insoles especially for the elderly, or patients with diabetic neuropathy or stroke.

See the Review of Modern Physics article for a comprehensive overview of stochastic resonance.

Stochastic Resonance has found noteworthy application in the field of image processing.

Signal analysis
A related phenomenon is dithering applied to analog signals before analog-to-digital conversion. Stochastic resonance can be used to measure transmittance amplitudes below an instrument's detection limit. If Gaussian noise is added to a subthreshold (i.e., immeasurable) signal, then it can be brought into a detectable region. After detection, the noise is removed. A fourfold improvement in the detection limit can be obtained.

See also
Mutual coherence (linear algebra)
Signal detection theory
Stochastic resonance (sensory neurobiology)

References

Bibliography

Hannes Risken The Fokker-Planck Equation, 2nd edition, Springer, 1989

Bibliography for suprathreshold stochastic resonance 
N. G. Stocks, "Suprathreshold stochastic resonance in multilevel threshold systems," Physical Review Letters, 84, pp. 2310–2313, 2000.
M. D. McDonnell, D. Abbott, and C. E. M. Pearce, "An analysis of noise enhanced information transmission in an array of comparators," Microelectronics Journal 33, pp. 1079–1089, 2002.
M. D. McDonnell and N. G. Stocks, "Suprathreshold stochastic resonance," Scholarpedia 4, Article No. 6508, 2009.
M. D. McDonnell, N. G. Stocks, C. E. M. Pearce, D. Abbott,  Stochastic Resonance: From Suprathreshold Stochastic Resonance to Stochastic Signal Quantization, Cambridge University Press, 2008.

External links

Scholar Google profile on stochastic resonance

Newsweek Being messy, both at home and in foreign policy, may have its own advantages Retrieved 3 Jan 2011
Stochastic Resonance Conference 1998–2008 ten years of continuous growth. 17-21 Aug. 2008, Perugia (Italy)
Stochastic Resonance - From Suprathreshold Stochastic Resonance to Stochastic Signal Quantization (book)
Review of Suprathreshold Stochastic Resonance
A.S. Samardak, A. Nogaret, N. B. Janson, A. G. Balanov, I. Farrer and D. A. Ritchie. "Noise-Controlled Signal Transmission in a Multithread Semiconductor Neuron" // Phys. Rev. Lett. 102 (2009) 226802, 

Biophysics
Stochastic processes
Statistical mechanics
Oscillation
Signal processing
Sensory systems